Clear Branch is a stream in Warren County in the U.S. state of Missouri. It is a tributary of the Missouri River.

Clear Branch was named for the character of its clean water.

See also
List of rivers of Missouri

References

Rivers of Warren County, Missouri
Rivers of Missouri